The European Bioinformatics Institute (EMBL-EBI) is an intergovernmental organization (IGO) which, as part of the European Molecular Biology Laboratory (EMBL) family, focuses on research and services in bioinformatics. It is located on the Wellcome Genome Campus in Hinxton near Cambridge, and employs over 600 full-time equivalent (FTE) staff. Institute leaders such as Rolf Apweiler, Alex Bateman, Ewan Birney, and Guy Cochrane, an adviser on the National Genomics Data Center Scientific Advisory Board, serve as part of the international research network of the BIG Data Center at the Beijing Institute of Genomics.

Additionally, the EMBL-EBI hosts training programs that teach scientists the fundamentals of the work with biological data and promote the plethora of bioinformatic tools available for their research, both EMBL-EBI and non-EMBL-EBI-based.

Bioinformatic services 
One of the roles of the EMBL-EBI is to index and maintain biological data in a set of databases, including Ensembl (housing whole genome sequence data), UniProt (protein sequence and annotation database) and Protein Data Bank (protein and nucleic acid tertiary structure database). A variety of online services and tools is provided, such as Basic Local Alignment Search Tool (BLAST) or Clustal Omega sequence alignment tool, enabling further data analysis.

BLAST 
BLAST is an algorithm for the comparison of biomacromolecule primary structure, most often nucleotide sequence of DNA/RNA and amino acid sequence of proteins, stored in the bioinformatic databases, with the query sequence. The algorithm utilizes scoring of the available sequences against the query by a scoring matrix such as BLOSUM 62. The highest scoring sequences represent the closest relatives of the query, in terms of functional and evolutionary similarity.

The database search by BLAST requires input data to be in a correct format (e.g. FASTA, GenBank, PIR or EMBL format). Users may also designate the specific databases to be searched, select scoring matrices to be used and other parameters prior to the tool run. The best hits in the BLAST results are ordered according to their calculated E value (the probability of the presence of a similarly or higher-scoring hit in the database by chance).

Clustal Omega 
Clustal Omega is a multiple sequence alignment (MSA) tool that enables to find an optimal alignment of at least three and maximum of 4000 input DNA and protein sequences. Clustal Omega algorithm employs two profile Hidden Markov models (HMMs) to derive the final alignment of the sequences. The output of the Clustal Omega may be visualized in a guide tree (the phylogenetic relationship of the best-pairing sequences) or ordered by the mutual sequence similarity between the queries. The main advantage of Clustal Omega over other MSA tools (Muscle, ProbCons) is its efficiency, while maintaining a significant accuracy of the results.

Ensembl 
Based at the EMBL-EBI, the Ensembl is a database organized around genomic data, maintained by the Ensembl Project. Tasked with the continuous annotation of the genomes of model organisms, Ensembl provides researchers a comprehensive resource of relevant biological information about each specific genome. The annotation of the stored reference genomes is automatic and sequence-based. Ensembl encompasses a publicly available genome database which can be accessed via a web browser. The stored data can be interacted with using a graphical UI, which supports the display of data in multiple resolution levels from karyotype, through individual genes, to nucleotide sequence.

Originally centered on vertebrate animals as its main field of interest, since 2009 Ensembl provides annotated data regarding the genomes of plants, fungi, invertebrates, bacteria and other species, in the sister project Ensembl Genomes. As of 2020, the various Ensembl project databases together house over 50,000 reference genomes.

PDB 
PDB is a database of three dimensional structures of biological macromolecules, such as proteins and nucleic acids. The data are typically obtained by X-ray crystallography or NMR spectroscopy, and submitted manually by structural biologists worldwide through PDB member organizations – PDBe, RCSB, PDBj and BMRB. The database can be accessed through the webpages of its members, including PDBe (housed at the EMBL-EBI). As a member of the wwPDB consortium, PDBe aids in the joint mission of archiving and maintenance of macromolecular structure data.

UniProt 
UniProt is an online repository of protein sequence and annotation data, distributed in UniProt Knowledgebase (UniProt KB), UniProt Reference Clusters (UniRef) and UniProt Archive (UniParc) databases. Originally conceived as the individual ventures of EMBL-EBI, Swiss Institute of Bioinformatics (SIB) (together maintaining Swiss-Prot and TrEMBL) and Protein Information Resource (PIR) (housing Protein Sequence Database), the increase in the global protein data generation led to their collaboration in the creation of UniProt in 2002.

The protein entries stored in UniProt are cataloged by a unique UniProt identifier. The annotation data collected for the each entry are organized in logical sections (e.g. protein function, structure, expression, sequence or relevant publications), allowing a coordinated overview about the protein of interest. Links to external databases and original sources of data are also provided. In addition to standard search by the protein name/identifier, UniProt webpage houses tools for BLAST searching, sequence alignment or searching for proteins containing specific peptides.

Other bioinformatics organisations
 National Center for Biotechnology Information (NCBI), United States National Library of Medicine
 National Institute of Genetics (DNA Data Bank of Japan)
 Swiss Institute of Bioinformatics (SIB: Expasy)
 Australia Bioinformatics Resource
  BIG Data Center (National Genomics Data Center), Beijing Institute of Genomics, Chinese Academy of Sciences

See also 
 Alternative splicing and transcript diversity database
 BioSamples
 European Molecular Biology Organization
 European Nucleotide Archive

References 

Bioinformatics organizations
Biological research institutes in the United Kingdom
Information technology organizations based in Europe
International research institutes
Molecular biology institutes
Partner institutions of the University of Cambridge
Research institutes established in 1992
Research institutes in Cambridgeshire
Science and technology in Europe
South Cambridgeshire District
Systems science institutes
1992 establishments in England